This is a list of Hatzalah chapters. Hatzalah is an all-volunteer Emergency medical services organization staffed by Jewish Orthodox Emergency medical technicians and Paramedics. Locations where chapters are situated are listed alphabetically by geography.

Each neighborhood or city in Hatzalah operates independently. There are some exceptions, where there is a tight affiliation with neighboring Hatzalahs, a loose affiliation of neighboring Hatzalahs, or some other basic level of co-operation.

Argentina
Buenos Aires (covering Once, Flores, Palermo, Barracas, Belgrano)

Australia
Melbourne
Sydney

Austria
Vienna

Belgium
Antwerp

Brazil
São Paulo (covering Jardim Paulista, Higienópolis, Bom Retiro)

Canada

Montreal, Quebec
Kiryas Tosh, Boisbriand, Quebec
Toronto, Ontario

Israel
 Hatzalah in Israel, on the national level, exists as two different organizations: Tzevet Hatzolah, and Ichud Hatzalah (rendered in English as United Hatzalah). Hatzolah Israel was the original organization, under the leadership of David "Duki" Greenwald. In 2006, Ichud Hatzalah was launched as competing organization with Hatzolah Israel, which eventually led Hatzolah Israel to declare bankruptcy. Many Hatzolah Israel volunteers who were dissatisfied with the actions of Ichud Hatzalah's leadership objected to joining the organization, and launched their own organization called Tzevet Hatzolah (loosely translated to TEAM Hatzolah).

While Tzevet Hatzolah volunteers provide both emergency first responder care and emergency transport utilizing Magen David Adom ambulances, Ichud Hatzalah only provides first responder care and rely on Magen David Adom for emergency transport.
Each of the organizations has many local chapters, and provides coordinated response for larger emergencies or extra coverage across multiple localities.

Additionally, there are several smaller Hatzolah organizations that operate on the local level. A partial list can be found below.
Beit Shemesh (unaffiliated; only service to provide both first response and ambulance transportation) 
Har Nof (affiliated with MDA, named HaChovesh, instead of Hatzolah)
Gush Dan (out of Bnei Brak, greater Tel Aviv area, including: Ra'anana, Herzliya, Netanya; unaffiliated)

Mexico
Chevra Hatzalah Mexico was founded in 1997 by Mr. Chaim Silver.  The branch is run by the Syrian-Sephardic community under supervision of Mr. Abraham Levy who is the CEO.  It has 70 full-time volunteers, seven ambulances and six locations (five bases and a headquarters).  It also has access to a helicopter and air transport.  All dispatchers are Volunteer EMS for immediate intervention and instructions, some of them certified in Advanced Critical Care Medicine and Emergency response, actually working for prestigious Mexican Hospitals and National Medical Centers. Volunteers have plenty of experience in Trauma and Internal Medicine emergencies, having training in the Mexican Red Cross's Ambulance Center. The branch covers the Jewish areas of Tecamachalco, Bosques, Polanco, Interlomas, and the weekend resort city Cuernavaca. It has full-time operating bases in three major Jewish areas, having its Central Base in Tecamachalco, a dense populated Jewish area in Mexico City.

Russia
Moscow

South Africa
Johannesburg

Switzerland
Zurich

United Kingdom

 North London
North West London
Edgware
London's Hatzalah itself is split into 4 sister organisations, one operating in Golders Green area, known as Hatzola North West, another based in Stamford Hill, known as North London Hatzola, Edgware Hatzola based in Edgware and the newest chapter, Hatzola Hertz operating in Borehamwood and Radlett.
Gateshead
Manchester

Ukraine

 Kyiv

United States

California
Los Angeles has a chapter whose units use the "LA" radio prefix, which provides Basic life support level care, and relies on the Los Angeles Fire Department for Advanced life support paramedic care and transport. On August 31, 2009, they began direct transport of patients to area hospitals using their own ambulance.
Los Angeles Covering Hancock Park / Fairfax, Pico-Robertson / Beverly wood / Beverly Hills, and Valley Village / North Hollywood / Tarzana / Encino.

Hatzolah of Los Angeles also works with LA Shmira Civilian Safety Patrol & Chaverim Emergency Services of Los Angeles on missing persons searches.
San Fernando Valley

Connecticut
The Orthodox community in Waterbury, CT, centered around the yeshiva there, has its own Hatzolah.
Waterbury, CT

In 2016 the Mesivta of Yeshiva of Waterbury moved to Durham, Ct. As Durham is 35 minutes away from the Jewish community in Waterbury, the Hatzolah of Durham was established which takes care of the Mesivta of Waterbury Yeshiva campus located in Durham, under the leadership and guidance of Rabbi Daniel Kalish.

Florida
In January 2010, Hatzalah of Miami-Dade began with providing Basic life support response in Miami-Dade County and relying on Miami-Dade Fire Rescue and Miami Beach Fire Department for Advanced life support care and transport. Coverage was eventually expanded to include communities in some areas of unincorporated North East Miami-Dade County and North Miami Beach, Aventura, Highland Lakes, Surfside, Bal Harbour, Bay Harbor Islands, Miami Beach, Hollywood, FL, Hallandale Beach and Lauderhill.

On April 26, 2021, the Florida Senate unanimously passed bill CS/HB 1084, which allows certain faith-based first responder agencies to obtain licensure as an ambulance transport provider. On June 14, 2021 Governor Ron DeSantis signed it into law.

Now known as Hatzalah South Florida Emergency Medical Services, the non-profit volunteer organization is a fully licensed Advanced life support service provider, and provides emergency Basic life support and Advanced life support response and transport in Miami-Dade, Broward and Palm Beach counties, serving communities in some areas of unincorporated North East Miami-Dade County and North Miami Beach, Aventura, Highland Lakes, Surfside, Bal Harbour, Bay Harbor Islands, Miami Beach, Hollywood, FL, Hallandale Beach, Lauderhill, Deerfield Beach and Boca Raton.

Illinois
In 2011, Hatzalah Chicago started providing non-transport Basic Life Support ("BLS") coverage for Lincolnwood, Peterson Park, Skokie, and West Rogers Park. Hatzalah Chicago started BLS transport in 2013 and Advanced Life Support ("ALS") service in 2018. They currently operate 4 ALS ambulances and have responded to over 10,000 calls for service.

Maryland
Baltimore started a Hatzalah in 2007 as a first-responder-only service, with transport to be done by Baltimore City ambulance units. Currently, Hatzalah of Baltimore does maintain a fleet of six ambulances, and provides Advanced Life Support (ALS) services to the Northwest Baltimore community, provided it is in their response area.

Michigan
Hatzalah of Michigan was formed in 2017 to augment existing emergency medical services in the cities of Oak Park, Southfield, and Huntington Woods. Hatzalah of Michigan is state licensed and regulated by the Oakland County Medical Control Authority (OCMCA). The OCMCA oversees all EMS personnel in the county. Hatzalah personnel are licensed EMS providers, who are further advised by a panel of doctors and have trained with fire and ambulance personnel to ensure continuity of care.

New Jersey

New Jersey has many Hatzolah organizations throughout the State. Each NJ affiliate maintains its own emergency phone number, dispatchers, and radio frequencies. While they are not officially connected, as with NYC Hatzolah, many of them are nevertheless loosely affiliated, sharing classes or working at each other's events. On occasion, all state divisions have worked together to provide joint event coverage or to share training classes.

Per New Jersey law, volunteers with proper permits may equip their cars with blue flashing lights and electronic airhorns, but neither red flashing lights nor sirens. Coordinators' ("officers") personal vehicles, and any vehicle owned by a squad with a "No Fee" license plate, are permitted the use of red flashing lights and sirens; not all branches make use of these allowances. Paramedic (ALS) units in New Jersey are only run by hospitals, per state law. The limitation to Basic Life Support (BLS) is not just for Hatzolah and other volunteer agencies: All New Jersey "911" municipal-run EMS services are also limited to BLS. However, see Central Jersey below for a special exception.

(Alphabetical)

Bergen County

Bergen Hatzalah, launched September 3, 2021, as the first Chevra Hatzalah (the New York-based parent organization) division in New Jersey, and the first new Chevra Hatzalah neighborhood division in over 30 years. Bergen Hatzalah units use the "BC" unit number prefix, though are audibly referred to with a "Bergen-prefix." The team spearheading Bergen Hatzalah has a combined more than century of Hatzalah and EMS experience. They've all lived in Bergen County for more than 20 years and have witnessed the need to bring Hatzalah's life saving services to their communities. Bergen Hatzalah has 3 ambulances and 6 emergency response cars in service as of September 2022. Bergen Hatzalah most notably responds in Englewood, Teaneck and Bergenfield and has responded to 23 (and counting) other areas within Bergen County, NJ.

Central Jersey (formerly Lakewood)

The largest branch in New Jersey, with "CJ-prefix" unit numbers. Unique to New Jersey, Central Jersey has a Paramedic (ALS) unit. The ALS unit is owned and run by MONOC, but the Paramedics are also Central Jersey Hatzolah members, and the ambulance was donated by Hatzolah Central Jersey to MONOC. This unusual arrangement meets New Jersey's strict hospital-based ALS rules, while giving Hatzolah its own ALS coverage. Also unique, Central Jersey has its own Rescue (extrication) unit.
Lakewood Township
- Toms River
- Brick
- Jackson
- Howell

Clark

On the heels of the successful launch of Linden Hatzolah, residents of Clark NJ have begun efforts to officially organize a Hatzolah chapter. While they border Linden, residents decided that they needed their own responders within their township to fulfill their needs. This is still in the planning stages and there is no set date as of yet as to when they will launch but the proposed unit prefix will be "CL".

Essex County (Newark)

Formerly Hatzalah of Newark, EMS, with the "N-prefix" unit numbers went live in 2015, and provides BLS service to the Newark community and surrounding areas, including Newark Liberty International Airport. ALS services, when needed, are dispatched by the local hospital. In September 2019, it has expanded, and is now called Hatzalah of Essex County.

Hudson County (Union City)

Formerly Hatzolah of Union City, HHC is run out of Mosded Sanz-Zviel, which is the center of the Chasidic community in Union City. Union City is located in Hudson County, and is not related to Union County (sometimes referred to as Hatzalah of Elizabeth) or Union City . Union City uses VHF radios, while all other New Jersey chapters use UHF radios.

Jersey Shore

This chapter covers the areas of Deal, West Deal, Long Branch, Oakhurst, Eatontown, Loch Arbour, West Allenhurst, Allenhurst, Ocean Township, and additional Jersey Shore communities during warmer months. This is the only Sephardic-run Hatzalah in the United States. (Mexico City, Mexico, also has a Sephardic Hatzalah.)

Linden

Hatzolah of Linden, NJ, with "LR-prefix" unit numbers. Linden uses the AT&T First Net system which is a cell phone based radio system. Hatzolah of Linden launched on August 25, 2021.  Hatzolah Of Linden Has 2 ambulances and a 3rd on the way, and serves over 350 Households living in the city of linden and the neighboring cities.

Metrowest

Hatzalah of Metrowest, (formerly Hatzalah of West Orange and Livingston, which launched on September 3, 2021) with "X-prefix" unit numbers. On September 24, 2022, Hatzalah announced its name change in parallel with the creation of a Morristown division. Areas of operation include West Orange, Livingston, Morristown and more than one dozen surrounding towns in Essex and Morris counties. Hatzalah of Metrowest is an active 911 mutual aid provider.

The organization has 34 EMTs, 2 Ambulances, and 2 Emergency Response Vehicles (ERVs).

Middlesex County

Hatzolah of Middlesex County, with "MC-prefix" unit numbers. Middlesex County is a county located in North-Central New Jersey. It launched on November 16, 2014. At this time, their primary areas of response are Edison (including Raritan Center), Highland Park, Piscataway, and portions of East Brunswick. For events in various hotels, they have responded to Somerset as well.

Passaic / Clifton

Hatzolah of Passaic / Clifton EMS. The neighboring cities have a contiguous Orthodox Jewish community, with most of the community and its institutions on the Passaic side. Likewise, Hatzolah of Passaic / Clifton, with "P-prefix" unit numbers, covers both parts of the community, but is primarily based in Passaic, with some members and management in Clifton. This Hatzolah is geographically near Union City, and can provide extra coverage for them. Hatzolah of Passaic / Clifton has 30 active members, 20 dispatchers, three active ambulances, and a 4 service units, for a community of about 2,000 households. In the Summer of 2022, Hatzolah of Passaic/Clifton inaugurated its first ambulance garage in the center of the community.

Union County

Hatzalah of Union County, with "U-prefix" unit numbers. Union County is geographically and organizationally separate from Union City. With three active ambulances, Union County units cover all of Union County including Hillside, Elizabeth, Union Township, and Roselle Park. Union County units may also respond to businesses and residences in the city of Newark that border Union County where slow EMS response may allow the Hatzalah ambulance to arrive from Elizabeth or Hillside before a Newark city crew arrives. Hatzalah of Union County also covers the Jersey Gardens Mall, Newark Liberty International Airport, and nearby stretches of the New Jersey Turnpike and Garden State Parkway. Three ambulances are located in the greater Elizabeth / Hillside area.

New York
Canarsie / Mill Basin
The Canarsie / Mill Basin chapter was originally just the Canarsie division. As the Canarsie Orthodox neighborhood declined, and the Mill Basin one grew, Canarsie started taking more calls and members from nearby Mill Basin, and is now primarily a Mill Basin operation. Canarsie / Mill Basin also covers nearby Georgetown. There are parts of the Brooklyn neighborhood of Mill Basin that border Madison / Midwood / East Midwood; so, there is some overlap in coverage with Flatbush.

Catskill Mountains
This chapter is part of Central Hatzalah of New York City. While the Catskills have a year-round operation, the vast majority of their activity is in July and August, when summer residents arrive.

Fleischmanns

Kiryas Joel/Monroe
The Hasidic community in Kiryas Joel (Monroe), NY, has a chapter. Uniquely, it operates separately from all other New York State Hatzolah organizations. It was founded in 1995.

Monroe, NY

New Square
This chapter is a break-off from the Rockland Hatzoloh chapter. Uniquely, the chapter has female Certified First Responders who respond to calls involving obstetrics-related emergencies.

New York City Central

This chapter has seventeen local divisions which share rabbinic counsel, radio frequencies, central dispatch, and lobbying, but have separate fund-raising and management.  Catskills, the Five Towns, and Yonkers are the only areas outside of New York City covered by NYC chapters.
The chapter has a central dispatching network, with teams of 2 volunteer dispatchers working in tandem. Each dispatch team works several hours on a shift. The chapter also uses a mobile command center for dealing with large events.
New York City chapters include Boro Park, Canarsie / Mill Basin, Crown Heights, Flatbush, Lower East Side, Midtown, Queens, Richmond, Riverdale, Rockaways / Lawrence, Seagate, Staten Island, Upper East Side, Upper West Side, Washington Heights, and Williamsburg.
Borough Park This chapter covers Kensington, Bensonhurst, Sunset Park, and sometimes Ditmas Park.
Canarsie. This chapter covers Canarsie, Flatlands, Georgetown, and Mill Basin, and is based in Mill Basin

Crown Heights
This chapter covers the Crown Heights and East Flatbush neighborhoods as well as Prospect Park.
Flatbush. This chapter covers the Brooklyn neighborhoods of Midwood, East Midwood, Madison, and Gravesend. The extended area includes Brighton Beach, Manhattan Beach, Ditmas Park, and Kensington, and, occasionally, Bensonhurst.
Lower East Side Manhattan (below 34th Street)
Midtown Manhattan
Queens, including Great Neck and JFK Airport
Richmond, Staten Island. This chapter covers the neighborhood of Willowbrook.
Riverdale. This chapter covers Riverdale, parts of Yonkers, in Westchester County, and extended regions of the Bronx.
Rockaway – Nassau County
Rockaway / Lawrence. This chapter covers the Rockaways and Lawrence, Arverne, Atlantic Beach, Bayswater, Belle Harbor, Cedarhurst, East Rockaway, Far Rockaway, Hewlett, Inwood, Kennedy Airport, Lawrence, Long Beach, North Woodmere, Rosedale, and Woodmere.
Sea Gate
Staten Island
Upper East Side Manhattan (34th street to 125th street Central Park / 5th Ave to East River)
Upper West Side Manhattan,
Washington Heights
Williamsburg (founding chapter)
Bergen

Rockland County
This chapter is unaffiliated with the New York Central Hatzolah. It has distinct rabbinical oversight, primarily due to several large Hasidic communities affiliated with Rockland Hatzolah.

Westchester County

Pennsylvania
Philadelphia's Hatzolah has limited service, providing first responder aid only in the Northeast area. Hatzolah of Philadelphia transports are provided by calling in either Patriot Ambulance, or, when the situation warrants, 9-1-1. Patriot Ambulance is a local paid ambulance service owned by a community member. Philadelphia has nine responders, all state-certified. Some members are full-time professional EMTs or Paramedics.

 Philadelphia (limited service in the Northeast)

Texas 

 Dallas
 Houston

See also
Hatzalah

References 

Ambulance services
Ambulance services in the United States
Ambulance services in Australia
First aid organizations
Jewish medical organizations
Judaism-related lists
Lists of organizations
Health-related lists